Anthony Dominique (born November 30, 1969) Dominican former footballer who played in the Dominica Premiere League, and the Canadian National Soccer League.

Playing career 
Dominique played in 1996 with the North York Talons in the Canadian National Soccer League. During the season he was selected for the CNSL All-Star team in match against Toronto Italia, which featured Diego Maradona. After the conclusion of season he returned to Dominica to play with Saint Joseph F.C. in the Dominica Premiere League. He returned to Canada in 1998 to play with London City in the Canadian Professional Soccer League, and made his debut on June 10, 1998 against Toronto Croatia.

International career 
Dominique played with the Dominica national football team, where he appeared in 4 matches and scored 1 goal. He participated in the 1998 FIFA World Cup qualification, where he played against Antigua and Barbuda, and Barbados.

References 

1969 births
Living people
Dominica international footballers
Dominica footballers
Dominica expatriate footballers
North York Astros players
London City players
Canadian National Soccer League players
Canadian Soccer League (1998–present) players
Association football forwards
Dominica expatriate sportspeople in Canada
Expatriate soccer players in Canada